The 6.8mm Remington Special Purpose Cartridge (6.8 SPC, 6.8 SPC II or 6.8×43mm) is a rimless bottlenecked intermediate rifle cartridge that was developed by Remington Arms in collaboration with members of the U.S. Army Marksmanship Unit and United States Special Operations Command to possibly replace the 5.56 NATO cartridge in short barreled rifles (SBR) and carbines. Based on the .30 Remington cartridge, it is midway between the 5.56×45mm NATO and 7.62×51mm NATO in bore diameter. It uses the same diameter bullet (usually not the same mass) as the .270 Winchester hunting cartridge.

Development 
The 6.8mm SPC cartridge was designed to address the deficiencies of the terminal ballistics of the 5.56×45mm NATO cartridge currently in service with the armed forces of all NATO-aligned countries. The cartridge was the result of the Enhanced Rifle Cartridge Program. The 6.8 SPC (6.8×43mm) was initially developed by Master Sergeant Steve Holland and Chris Murray, a United States Army Marksmanship Unit gunsmith, to offer superior downrange lethality over the 5.56 NATO/.223 Remington in an M16-pattern service rifle with minimal loss of magazine capacity and a negligible increase in recoil.

The program started the design by using a .30 Remington case, which was modified in length to fit into magazines that would be accommodated by the magazine wells of the M16 family of rifles and carbines that are currently in service with the U.S. Armed Forces.

In tests comparing various caliber bullets using a .30 Remington parent case, Holland and Murray determined that a 6.5 mm caliber projectile had the best accuracy and penetration, with historical data going back for decades of US Army exterior and terminal ballistic testing, but a 7 mm projectile had the best terminal performance. The combination of the cartridge case, powder load, and projectile easily outperformed the 7.62×39mm and 5.45×39mm Soviet cartridges, with the new cartridge's muzzle velocity proving to be about  faster than the 7.62 x 39.

The 6.8mm Remington SPC was designed to perform better in short-barreled CQB rifles after diminished performance from the 5.56 NATO when the M16A4 was changed from the rifle configuration to the current M4 carbine. The 6.8mm SPC is not the ballistic equal of the 7.62×51mm NATO cartridge, but it has less recoil, has been said to be more controllable in rapid fire, and is lighter, allowing operators to carry more ammunition than would otherwise be possible with the larger caliber round.
One of the enigmatic features of this cartridge is its being designed for a short-barrel carbine length rifle than the standard rifle length is (usually ). It also does well in rifles with less than  barrels. The personal defense weapon (PDW) known as the "Six8" is SPC II w 1: twist and is able to use all current 6.8 SPC factory ammunition.

Muzzle velocity from a  barrel

Muzzle velocity from a  barrel

Muzzle velocity from a  barrel

Comparison to other military calibers

Typical trajectory information from carbines with drop and velocity calculated at sea level with a  zero.

Applications

Military and law enforcement adoption
By late 2004 the 6.8×43mm SPC was said to be performing well in the field against enemy combatants in special operations. However the cartridge was not used by conventional US military personnel.  It was not adopted for widespread use due to resistance from officials. The 6.8 SPC was designed for better terminal effectiveness at the shorter ranges of urban combat experienced in Iraq.  When fighting in Afghanistan began to intensify, engagements began taking place at greater distances, where the 6.8 SPC begins to falter.  Experiments suggested that the comparatively short 6.8 mm bullets became ineffective at longer ranges. In 2007, both the U.S. SOCOM and the U.S. Marine Corps decided not to field weapons chambered in 6.8 mm due to logistical and cost issues.

While there are many rumors of evaluations of the cartridge by several major federal and local law enforcement agencies, the US Drug Enforcement Administration has allowed individual agents to purchase the M6A2 D-DEA – which uses the 6.8mm Remington SPC – as an authorized alternative to their duty weapon.  In 2010 the Jordanian state-owned arms manufacturer KADDB announced that they would be producing 6.8 mm rifles and carbines for the Jordanian Army.  There is also a contract between LWRC, Magpul, Alliant Techsystems and the Saudi Royal Guard for around 36,000 Six8 PDWs and an undisclosed amount of ATK/Federal XD68GD (90gr Gold Dot "training" ammo) and proprietary Magpul 6.8 Pmags specifically for the LWRC Six8.

Semiautomatic action
The first major manufacturer to offer a 6.8mm Remington SPC-chambered version of the AR-15 was Barrett Firearms Company, offering the Barrett M468 and later the REC7.  By 2007, most major manufacturers of AR-15-type rifles for the civilian gun market were offering rifles in this caliber. Dedicated AR upper receiver assemblies chambered for the round are produced by a number of smaller firms, including Daniel Defense.  Ruger Firearms no longer produces a 6.8 mm for their Ruger SR-556 piston-driven AR-15 variant. The Stag Arms hunter and tactical models utilize the newer chamber (SPC II) and specified twist rates to accommodate higher pressure loadings, as well as upper receivers in left-handed configurations. Rock River Arms has an LAR-6.8 X Series rifle and uppers. Microtech Small Arms Research offers their version of the Steyr AUG in 6.8. Robinson Armament Co. offers the XCR-L in 6.8, which can be easily converted between 6.8, 5.56, and 7.62×39. Bushmaster delivered a 6.8 SPC II conversion kit to the market as of October 2018.  Ruger Firearms chambered their Mini-14 ranch rifle in this round for several years; however, it has been discontinued.

See also 
 .224 Valkyrie, 6.8 SPC derivative cartridge
 6mm ARC
 6mm SAW, similar cartridge developed to approximate both 7.62×51mm and 5.56×45mm cartridges
 .280 British, similar cartridge developed during the 1940s in the UK
 .276 Pedersen, similar cartridge developed in 1923 in the US
 .277 Wolverine, 6.8mm AR-15 wildcat based on 5.56×45mm case
 List of AR platform cartridges
 List of individual weapons of the U.S. Armed Forces

Notes

External links 
 Definitive history of 6.8 SPC- The 6.8 SPC, Is it all that?
 6.8 SPC FAQ
 Remington Ammunition Information 
 M468 Rifle 
 Defense Review
 Gunblast.com article
 Sharper Shooting: Upgrading Ammunition Lethality
 First Look: The 6.8mm Remington SPC

Paramilitary cartridges
Pistol and rifle cartridges
Remington Arms cartridges